Posht-e Gar may refer to:
 Posht-e Gar, Kerman
 Posht-e Gar, Sistan and Baluchestan